The 2013–14 Pakistan Premier League was the 10th season of the Pakistan Premier League and the 59th season of Pakistan domestic football. The league began on 1 September 2013 and ended on 8 February 2014. Khan Research Laboratories ended up winning the championship for the third consecutive season and fourth title overall. Zarai Taraqiati, playing their first season after promotion, withdrew from the league after playing 17 games

Teams
PMC Club Athletico Faisalabad and Wohaib were relegated at the end of the 2012–13 campaign. They were replaced by Pak Afghan Clearing and Lyallpur.

Location and stadia

League table

Awards

References

Pakistan Premier League seasons
1
Pakistan